Novelis Inc. is an American industrial aluminum company, headquartered in Atlanta, Georgia, United States. It is an independent subsidiary of multinational aluminium and copper manufacturing company Hindalco Industries. Novelis is a producer of rolled aluminum and an aluminum recycler. The company serves customers in sectors including beverage cans, automotive, aerospace, consumer electronics, construction, foil and packaging.

Novelis is investing $2.5 billion in a new, low-carbon,  aluminum plant in Bay Minette, Alabama. Once complete, it will be a fully integrated U.S. mill.

Company history

The Novelis company was spun off from Canadian mining and aluminum manufacturer, Alcan Inc. and incorporated in 2005. The company was acquired by India's Hindalco Industries for $6 billion in 2007.This makes Novelis a member of the Aditya Birla Group.

Operations

Novelis is the world’s largest producer of rolled aluminum sheet, with operations spanning 11 countries and nearly 11,000 employees. The company divides its operations into four regions: North America, Europe, Asia, and South America. The regional headquarters are Atlanta, Zurich, Seoul, and Sao Paulo. Novelis also has operations in UK, Germany, Italy, France, Canada, China, Malaysia and Vietnam .

The company invested $100 million in its first manufacturing facility in China, which opened in 2014. In response to global demand for aluminum sheet for automotive, electronics and beverage cans, the company has announced capital investments including a $400 million expansion in Asia, a $300 million expansion in Brazil and $200 million expansion in North America. In July 2014, it announced that Reynolds Consumer Products Inc., a subsidiary of the Rank Group of New Zealand, purchased the North American consumer products division of Novelis, for CAD $33.75mn.

Novelis recycles more than 70 billion used beverage cans each year.

Production

Packaging
 Foil packaging
 Closures
 Beverage Cans - Novelis produces sheet aluminum that it sells to the following companies to be made into cans:
 Anheuser-Busch
 Ball Corporation
 Coca-Cola
 GZ Industries Ltd Nigeria
 Rexam

Automotive & Transportation
Aluminum structures and components for transportation products in automotive, automotive heat exchanger and mass transportation.

Auto sheet customers include:
 Audi
 BMW
 Ferrari
 Ford
 GM
 Hyundai
 Mercedes-Benz
 Jaguar
 Porsche
 Volvo
 Range Rover

Specialty
 Architecture & Building
 Facade
 Roofing
 Insulation
 Shutters
 Lithography & Printing
 Consumer Goods
 Smartphones, laptops, TV
 Industrial Applications

Sustainability

In 2012, Novelis released its second annual sustainability report. The report stated:
 19% reduction in energy intensity – halfway to Novelis' 2020 goal of 39 percent
 11% reduction in water intensity, almost halfway to its goal of 25 percent
 7% reduction in greenhouse gas emissions, representing significant progress towards reaching its total goal of halving Novelis' absolute GHGs
 18% improvement towards the company's goal of reducing waste to landfill to zero.

The Novelis report received an A rating from the Global Reporting Initiative (GRI), the world's most widely used framework for sustainability reporting.

Acquisitions 
On 15 April 2020, Hindalco Industries' subsidiary Novelis Inc. acquired Aleris Corporation for $2.8 billion. Through this acquisition Novelis entered into the high-end aerospace segment.

Awards and accomplishments
 2013, Novelis was named metals company of the year, and Novelis CEO Phil Martens was named CEO of the year on the Platts Global Metals Awards in London
 2012, Novelis CEO Phil Martens was named one of the top 25 CEOs in the world by Best Practice Institute
 2012 Aluminium Awards for Innovation Leadership
 2012 American Metal Market Award for Aluminum Excellence in Environmental Responsibility in 2012:
 2012 Georgia Governor’s International Award for establishing its Global Research & Technology Center in Kennesaw, GA.
 2011 Innovation Award from BMW
 2009 Vision Award from Keep America Beautiful

Notes

External links
 Novelis web site

Aditya Birla Group
Aluminum companies of the United States
Manufacturing companies based in Atlanta
American companies established in 2005
Manufacturing companies established in 2005
2007 mergers and acquisitions
American subsidiaries of foreign companies
Corporate spin-offs
Hindalco Industries